Kol Rural LLG is a local-level government (LLG) of Jiwaka Province, Papua New Guinea.

Wards
01. Maipka/Kol Station
02. Wamku
03. Kuimin
04. Meginapol
05. Mongom
06. Maime
07. Kunomol
08. Kuma
09. Gebal
10. Iwaramul
11. Dungo
12. Bubulsinga
13. Omun
14. Kalimbkul
15. Bubkale
16. Bial
17. Kosap
18. Kurunga
19. Kaulo
20. Mokuna
21. Yambdop
22. Waramanz 1
23. Waramanz 2
24. Gakip
25. Junk/Arbid

References

Local-level governments of Jiwaka Province